Raaj Kumar (born Kulbhushan Pandit; 8 October 1926  3 July 1996) was an Indian actor who worked in Hindi films. He appeared in the Oscar-nominated 1957 film Mother India and starred in over 70 Hindi films in a career that spanned over four decades.

Personal life
Kulbhushan Pandit was born on 8 October, 1926 in Loralai in the Baluchistan Province of British India (now in Pakistan) into a Kashmiri Pandit family. In the late 1940s, he moved to Bombay, where he became a sub-inspector under Bombay Police. He married Jennifer Pandit, an Anglo-Indian, whom he met on a flight where she was an air hostess. She later changed her name to Gayatri Kumar as per Hindu customs. They had three children, sons Puru Raaj Kumar (an actor), Panini Raaj Kumar and daughter Vastavikta Pandit, who made her screen debut in 2006 film Eight: The Power of Shani.

Career
Raaj Kumar made his acting debut in the 1952 film Rangili and appeared in films like Aabshar, Ghamand and Lakhon Mein Ek, but it was as Prince Naushazad in Sohrab Modi's Nausherwan-E-Adil (1957) that he became famous. In 1957, he achieved prominence with his brief role as the husband of Nargis in Mother India. He also worked alongside Shammi Kapoor in Ujala (1959). He followed this with the unglamorous role of a mill worker in Paigham (1959) alongside Dilip Kumar. In Sridhar's Dil Ek Mandir (1963), Raaj Kumar played the role of a cancer patient for which he won the Filmfare Award in the Best supporting actor category. He was cast with Sunil Dutt, Shashi Kapoor and Balraj Sahni in Yash Chopra's family drama Waqt in 1965. He became known for his distinct style of dialogue delivery.

His other notable films included Hamraaz (1967), Heer Raanjha (1971), Maryada (1971), Lal Patthar (1971) and Pakeezah (1972). After a period of flops in the late 1970s and early 1980s, he had notable successes as a supporting actor in Kudrat (1981), Ek Nai Paheli (1984), Marte Dam Tak (1987), Muqaddar Ka Faisla (1987) and Jung Baaz (1989). In 1991, he reunited with fellow veteran actor Dilip Kumar after 32 years in Subhash Ghai's Saudagar. His last hit film was the 1992 film Tirangaa and his final film was 1995's [[God and Gun|God & Gun]].

Death
Kumar died at the age of 69 on 3 July 1996 due to throat cancer. According to his son Puru Raaj Kumar in his interview to Farhana Farook, his father suffered from Hodgkins for which he had chemotherapy. The last two years of his life were bad with the nodes recurring in the lungs and ribs.

Filmography

References

External links

Indian male film actors
1926 births
1996 deaths
Kashmiri Pandits
Indian people of Kashmiri descent
Male actors in Hindi cinema
Police officers from Mumbai
Male actors from Mumbai
20th-century Indian male actors
Kashmiri people
Indian Hindus
Filmfare Awards winners